Heroes Shed No Tears may refer to:
Heroes Shed No Tears (1980 film), directed by Chu Yuan
Heroes Shed No Tears (1986 film), directed by John Woo